There have been two baronetcies created for persons with the surname Walsh, one in the Baronetage of Ireland and one in the Baronetage of the United Kingdom. Both creations are extinct.

The Walsh Baronetcy, of Little Ireland in the County of Waterford, was created in the Baronetage of Ireland in July 1645 for James Walsh. The title became extinct on the death of the second Baronet in circa 1690.

The Walsh Baronetcy, of Ormathwaite in the County of Cumberland and of Warfield in the County of Berkshire, was created in the Baronetage of the United Kingdom on 14 June 1804. For more information on this creation, see Baron Ormathwaite.

Walsh baronets, of Little Ireland (1645)
Sir James Walsh, 1st Baronet (–)
Sir Robert Walsh, 2nd Baronet (died c. 1690)

Walsh baronets, of Ormathwaite and Warfield (1804)
see Baron Ormathwaite

References

Extinct baronetcies in the Baronetage of Ireland
Extinct baronetcies in the Baronetage of the United Kingdom